William Tirry OSA (1609 – 12 May 1654) was an Irish Roman Catholic priest of the Order of Saint Augustine. He suffered martyrdom in Clonmel as part of the religious persecution of the Catholic Church in Ireland that followed the Cromwellian conquest. Pope John Paul II beatified Friar William Tirry in 1992.

Life
Tirry was born into a well-to-do family of Hiberno-Norman merchants in Cork, Ireland in 1608, the son of Robert and Joan Tirry. He was named after his uncle, the elder William Tirry, Bishop of Cork and Cloyne. Tirry was the grandson of Edmond Terry, or Tirry, Lord Mayor of Cork, and his wife Catherine Galway. His aunt Joan married Dominick Sarsfield, 1st Viscount Sarsfield, the Chief Justice of the Irish Common Pleas: their son William, the 2nd Viscount, played an important role in Tirry's life as his patron and protector.

Well-educated, he learned Ecclesiastical Latin and Koine Greek, but also spoke the Classical Gaelic literary language and the Munster Irish vernacular. At the age of eighteen, he joined the Augustinian Order at St. Austin's Abbey in Cork, and studied in Valladolid, where he was ordained around 1634. He completed his studies in Paris, and then spent five years (1636–1641) in Brussels, Belgium.

Ministry 
He returned to Ireland in 1641. Because community life was impossible at the time, he served as secretary to his uncle, the bishop. Then he found safe refuge with his Roman Catholic cousin William Sarsfield, 2nd Viscount Sarsfield, and acted as tutor to his sons. Tirry was elected Provincial Secretary in 1646. Lord Sarsfield's death in 1648 deprived Tirry of his chief protector. In 1649 he was chosen as prior of the Augustinian convent in Skreen but was unable to assume his duties there as this was the same year that marked the beginning of the Cromwellian conquest of Ireland. A law was enacted on 6 January 1653 declaring that any Roman Catholic priest in Ireland was guilty of treason. Tirry was forced into hiding alongside other priests. 

Much of the time he found shelter with his distant cousins, the Everards of Fethard, County Tipperary.

Imprisonment and Execution 
After being arrested at Fethard while vested for Mass on Holy Saturday, 25 March, 1654, Fr. Tirry was taken to Clonmel Gaol (on the future location of the Clonmel Borstal) and held there pending trial. Three men had reported his whereabouts for the £5 bounty. On 26 April, he was tried by a jury and a panel of Commonwealth judges, including New Model Army Colonel Solomon Richards, for violating the Proclamation of 6 January 1653, which defined it as high treason for priests to remain in Ireland. In his own defense, Fr. Tirry replied that while he viewed the Commonwealth as the lawful Government, he had no choice but to disobey it's laws, as both the Pope and his Augustinian superiors had ordered him to remain in Ireland. Fr. Tirry was according found guilty and sentenced to death by hanging, which was carried out in Clonmel on 2 May 1654.

An account told by Franciscan Friar Matthew Fogarty, who had been tried with Friar William Tirry, supplies further details: "William, wearing his Augustinian habit, was led to the gallows praying the rosary. He blessed the crowd which had gathered, pardoned his betrayers and affirmed his faith. It was a moving moment for Catholics and Protestants alike."

Despite the efforts of a Puritan minister to silence him, Fr. Tirry told the assembled crowd, "there is only one true Church, whose head is the pope: Pope and Church are to be obeyed. He publicly forgave the three men who had betrayed him, and... stated explicitly that he had been offered life and favour, it would renounce his religion." Fr. Tirry was then hanged, after which he was buried, with some ceremony, in the ruins of the Augustinian friary in nearby Fethard. The evidence is that he was buried in the grounds, rather than inside the ruins of the church, but it has not yet been possible to locate his grave.

Commemoration
Fr. William Tirry was beatified by Pope John Paul II along with 16 other Irish Catholic Martyrs on 27 September 1993. The Augustinian order celebrates his feast day on 12 May.

References

External links
 The Ballad of William Tirry
 "Ireland", Augnet - 4845

1609 births
1654 deaths
17th-century Irish Roman Catholic priests
Irish beatified people
17th-century Roman Catholic martyrs
Martyred Roman Catholic priests
Christian clergy from County Cork
Victims of anti-Catholic violence in Ireland
People executed under the Interregnum (England) by hanging
Executed Irish people
Beatifications by Pope John Paul II
24 Irish Catholic Martyrs